The Battle of Kursk, a campaign on the Russian Front of World War II, was fought in July and August 1943 by the armies of Nazi Germany and the Soviet Union. It is generally considered to be the largest combat involving armored forces in history. 

The battle began with the German offensive Operation Citadel, an attack on a bulge of Soviet forces protruding from the front lines to the west. Along the northern face of the bulge, forces of German Army Group Center under Feldmarschal Gunther von Kluge attacked the Soviet Western Front, commanded by Army General Konstanty Rokossowski. Along the southern face of the bulge, forces of German Army Group South under Feldmarschal Erich von Manstein attacked the Soviet Voronezh Front, commanded by Army General Nikolai Vatutin. 

The two German forces intended to meet near the Russian city of Kursk, thereby pinching off and surrounding a huge concentration of Soviet troops. The Soviets, however, were alert to the buildup of German forces, and had made very extensive preparations to meet an assault. Citadel bogged down and the Soviets counterattacked.

Northern Sector (Orel Salient)

Axis Forces

Army Group Center 

Feldmarschal Gunther von Kluge

Armies deployed north to south:

 Second Panzer Army
 Generalleutnant Rudolf Schmidt

 LIII Corps (General Friedrich Gollwitzer)
  211th Infantry Division
  293rd Infantry Division
  25th Panzergrenadier Division
  208th Infantry Division
  112th Infantry Division (reserve)

 LV Corps (General Erich Jaschke)
  321st Infantry Division
  339th Infantry Division
  110th Infantry Division
  296th Infantry Division
  134th Infantry Division

 XXXV Corps (General Lothar Rendulic)
  34th Infantry Division
  56th Infantry Division
  262nd Infantry Division
  299th Infantry Division
  36th Infantry Division (2 regiments, reserve)

 Other units
  5th Panzer Division (Second Army reserve)
  8th Panzer Division (OKH reserve)
  305th Security Division
  707th Security Division

 Ninth Army
 Generaloberst Walther Model
 ‡ Units involved in the initial German assault 5 July
 Corps deployed west to east:

 XX Corps (General Rudolf Freiherr von Roman)
  72nd Infantry Division
  45th Infantry Division
  137th Infantry Division
  251st Infantry Division

 XLVI Panzer Corps (General Hans Zorn)
  102nd Infantry Division
  258th Infantry Division
  7th Infantry Division ‡
  31st Infantry Division ‡

 XLVII Panzer Corps (General Joachim Lemelsen)
  20th Panzer Division ‡
  6th Infantry Division ‡
  2nd Panzer Division ‡
  9th Panzer Division ‡

 XLI Panzer Corps (General Josef Harpe) 
  292nd Infantry Division ‡
  18th Panzer Division ‡
  86th Infantry Division ‡

 XXIII Corps (General Johannes Frießner)
  78th Assault Division ‡
  216th Infantry Division
  383rd Infantry Division
  36th Infantry Division (1 regiment, reserve)

 Other units
  10th Panzergrenadier Division (Ninth Army reserve)
  12th Panzer Division (Ninth Army reserve)
  4th Panzer Division (Ninth Army reserve)
  203rd Security Division
  221st Security Division
 Hungarian VIII Corps
  102nd Infantry Division
  105th Infantry Division
  108th Infantry Division

 Second Army
 Generaloberst Walter Weiß

 VII Corps (General Ernst-Eberhard Hell)
  26th Infantry Division
  68th Infantry Division
  75th Infantry Division
  88th Infantry Division

 XIII Corps (General Erich Straube)
  82nd Infantry Division
  327th Infantry Division
  340th Infantry Division

 Luftflotte 6
 Generaloberst Robert Ritter von Greim
  1. Flieger Division

Soviet Forces

Western Front 

Colonel General Vasily Sokolovsky

 Eleventh Guards Army
 Lieutenant General Ivan Bagramyan
 8th Guards Rifle Corps (Major General Pyotr Malyshev)
  11th Guards Rifle Division
  26th Guards Rifle Division
  83rd Guards Rifle Division
 16th Guards Rifle Corps (Major General Afanasy Lapshov)
  1st Guards Rifle Division
  16th Guards Rifle Division
  31st Guards Rifle Division
  169th Rifle Division
 36th Guards Rifle Corps (Major General Alexander Ksenofontov)
  5th Guards Rifle Division
  18th Guards Rifle Division
  84th Guards Rifle Division
  108th Rifle Division
  217th Rifle Division
 8th Breakthrough Artillery Corps (Lieutenant General Nikolai Salichko)
  3rd Breakthrough Artillery Division
  6th Breakthrough Artillery Division
  14th Artillery Division
  14th Anti-Aircraft Artillery Division
  17th Anti-Aircraft Artillery Division
  48th Anti-Aircraft Artillery Division

 Fiftieth Army
 Lieutenant General Ivan Boldin
 38th Rifle Corps (Major General Alexey Tereshkov)
  17th Rifle Division
  326th Rifle Division
  413th Rifle Division
 Independent
  49th Rifle Division
  64th Rifle Division
  212th Rifle Division
  324th Rifle Division

 Front assets
  371st Rifle Division
  1st Tank Corps (Major General Vasily Butkov)
  5th Tank Corps (Major General Mikhail Sakhno)

 First Air Army
 Lieutenant General Mikhail Gromov
  2nd Assault Aviation Corps (Major General Vasily Stepichev)
  2nd Fighter Aviation Corps (Lieutenant General Alexey Blagoveshchensky)
  8th Fighter Aviation Corps (Major General Fyodor Zherebchenko)

Bryansk Front 

Colonel General Markian Popov

 Third Army
 Lieutenant General Alexander Gorbatov
 41st Rifle Corps (Major General Viktor Urbanovich)
  235th Rifle Division
  308th Rifle Division
  380th Rifle Division
 Independent
  269th Rifle Division
  283rd Rifle Division
  342nd Rifle Division
  20th Breakthrough Artillery Division
  24th Anti-Aircraft Artillery Division

 Sixty-First Army
 Lieutenant General Pavel Belov
 9th Guards Rifle Corps (Major General Arkady Boreyko)
  12th Guards Rifle Division
  76th Guards Rifle Division
  77th Guards Rifle Division
 Independent
  97th Rifle Division
  110th Rifle Division
  336th Rifle Division
  356th Rifle Division
  415th Rifle Division
  13th Anti-Aircraft Artillery Division

 Sixty-Third Army
 Lieutenant General Vladimir Kolpakchi
 35th Rifle Corps (headquarters only, Major General Viktor Zholudev)
 40th Rifle Corps (headquarters only, Major General Vladimir Kuznetsov)
  5th Rifle Division
  41st Rifle Division
  129th Rifle Division
  250th Rifle Division
  287th Rifle Division
  348th Rifle Division
  397th Rifle Division
  28th Anti-Aircraft Artillery Division

 Front Assets
 25th Rifle Corps (Major General Pyotr Pererva)
  186th Rifle Division
  283rd Rifle Division
  362nd Rifle Division
 1st Guards Tank Corps (Major General Mikhail Panov)
 2nd Breakthrough Artillery Corps (to 63rd Army, Lieutenant General Mikhail Barsukov)
  13th Breakthrough Artillery Division
  15th Breakthrough Artillery Division
  3rd Guards Mortar Division
 7th Breakthrough Artillery Corps (to 61st Army, Major General Pavel Korolkov)
  16th Breakthrough Artillery Division
  17th Breakthrough Artillery Division
  2nd Guards Mortar Division

 Fifteenth Air Army
 Lieutenant General Nikolai Naumenko
  1st Guards Fighter Aviation Corps (Lieutenant General Yevgeny Beletsky) 
  3rd Assault Aviation Corps (Major General Mikhail Gorlachenko)

Central Front 

Army General Konstantin Rokossovsky

Armies deployed west to east:

 Sixtieth Army
 Lieutenant General Ivan Chernyakhovsky
 24th Rifle Corps (Major General Nikolai Kiryukhin)
  42nd Rifle Division
  112th Rifle Division
 30th Rifle Corps (Major General Grigory Lazko)
  121st Rifle Division
  141st Rifle Division
  322nd Rifle Division
 Independent
  55th Rifle Division
  150th Tank Brigade

 Sixty-Fifth Army
 Lieutenant General Pavel Batov
 18th Rifle Corps (Major General )
  69th Rifle Division
  149th Rifle Division
  246th Rifle Division
 27th Rifle Corps (Major General Filipp Cherokmanov)
  60th Rifle Division
  193rd Rifle Division
 Independent
  37th Guards Rifle Division
  181st Rifle Division
  194th Rifle Division
  354th Rifle Division

 Seventieth Army
 Lieutenant General Ivan Galanin
 ‡ Units involved in the initial German assault 5 July
 28th Rifle Corps (Major General )
  211th Rifle Division
  280th Rifle Division ‡
  132nd Rifle Division ‡

 Independent
  102nd Rifle Division
  106th Rifle Division
  140th Rifle Division
  162nd Rifle Division
  175th Rifle Division
  1st Guards Artillery Division
  12th Anti-Aircraft Artillery Division

 Second Tank Army
 Lieutenant General Alexey Rodin
  3rd Tank Corps (Major General Maxim Sinenko)
  16th Tank Corps (Major General Vasily Grigoryev)

 Thirteenth Army
 Lieutenant General Nikolai Pukhov
 ‡ Units involved in the initial German assault 5 July
 17th Guards Rifle Corps (Lieutenant General Andrei Bondarev)
  6th Guards Rifle Division 
  70th Guards Rifle Division
  75th Guards Rifle Division
 18th Guards Rifle Corps (Major General Ivan Afonin)
  2nd Guards Airborne Division
  3rd Guards Airborne Division
  4th Guards Airborne Division
 15th Rifle Corps (Major General Ivan Lyudnikov)
  8th Rifle Division ‡
  74th Rifle Division
  148th Rifle Division ‡
 29th Rifle Corps (Major General Afanasy Slyshkin)
  15th Rifle Division ‡
  81st Rifle Division ‡
  307th Rifle Division ‡
 4th Breakthrough Artillery Corps (Major General Nikolai Ignatov)
  5th Breakthrough Artillery Division
  12th Breakthrough Artillery Division
  5th Guards Mortar Division
 Independent
  129th Tank Brigade
  1st Anti-Aircraft Artillery Division
  25th Anti-Aircraft Artillery Division

 Forty-Eighth Army
 Lieutenant General Prokofy Romanenko
 42nd Rifle Corps (Major General Konstantin Kolganov)
  16th Rifle Division
  202nd Rifle Division
  399th Rifle Division
 Independent
  73rd Rifle Division
  137th Rifle Division
  143rd Rifle Division
  170th Rifle Division
  16th Anti-Aircraft Artillery Division

 Front Assets
  9th Tank Corps (Major General Semyon Bogdanov)
  19th Tank Corps (Major General Ivan Vasilyev)
  10th Anti-Aircraft Artillery Division

 Sixteenth Air Army
 Lieutenant General Sergei Rudenko
  3rd Bomber Aviation Corps (Major General Afanasy Karavatsky)
  6th Mixed Aviation Corps (Major General Ivan Antoshkin)
  6th Fighter Aviation Corps (Major General Yevgeny Erlykin)

Southern Sector (Belgorod Salient)

Axis Forces

Army Group South 

Feldmarschal Erich von Manstein

Armies deployed west to east:

 Fourth Panzer Army
 Generaloberst Hermann Hoth
 ‡ Units involved in the initial German assault 5 July
 LII Corps (Eugen Ott)
  57th Infantry Division
  255th Infantry Division
  332nd Infantry Division ‡
 XLVIII Panzer Corps (Otto von Knobelsdorff)
  3rd Panzer Division
  11th Panzer Division
  Panzergrenadier Division Großdeutschland ‡
  167th Infantry Division
 II SS Panzer Corps (Paul Hausser)
  1st SS Panzergrenadier Division Leibstandarte SS Adolf Hitler ‡
  2nd SS Panzergrenadier Division Das Reich ‡
  3rd SS Panzergrenadier Division Totenkopf ‡

 Army Group Reserve
 XXIV Panzer Corps (Walter Nehring)
  5th SS Panzergrenadier Division Wiking
  17th Panzer Division

 Army Detachment Kempf
 General Werner Kempf
 ‡ Units involved in the initial German assault 5 July
 III Panzer Corps (Hermann Breith)
  6th Panzer Division ‡
  7th Panzer Division ‡
  19th Panzer Division ‡
  168th Infantry Division ‡
 XI Army Corps (Erhard Raus)
  106th Infantry Division ‡
  320th Infantry Division ‡
 XLII Corps (Franz Mattenklott)
  39th Infantry Division
  161st Infantry Division
  282nd Infantry Division

 Luftflotte 4
 General Otto Deßloch
  VIII. Fliegerkorps

Soviet forces

Voronezh Front 

Army General Nikolai Vatutin

Armies deployed north to south:

 Thirty-Eighth Army (Nikandr Chibisov)
 50th Rifle Corps
  167th Rifle Division
  232nd Rifle Division
  340th Rifle Division
 51st Rifle Corps (Petr Avdeenko)
  180th Rifle Division
  240th Rifle Division
 Independent
  204th Rifle Division
  180th Separate Tank Brigade
  192nd Separate Tank Brigade

 Fortieth Army (Kirill Moskalenko)
 47th Rifle Corps
  161st Rifle Division
  206th Rifle Division
  237th Rifle Division
 52nd Rifle Corps (Frants Perkhorovich)
  100th Rifle Division
  219th Rifle Division
  309th Rifle Division
 Independent
  184th Rifle Division
  86th Separate Tank Brigade

 Sixth Guards Army (Ivan Chistyakov)
 22nd Guards Rifle Corps
  67th Guards Rifle Division ‡
  71st Guards Rifle Division ‡
  90th Guards Rifle Division
 23rd Guards Rifle Corps
  51st Guards Rifle Division
  52nd Guards Rifle Division ‡
  375th Rifle Division
 Independent 
  89th Guards Rifle Division
  96th Tank Brigade

 Seventh Guards Army (Mikhail Shumilov)
 24th Guards Rifle Corps (Nikolai Vasilev)
  15th Guards Rifle Division
  36th Guards Rifle Division
  72nd Guards Rifle Division
 25th Guards Rifle Corps (Gany Safiulin)
  73rd Guards Rifle Division
  78th Guards Rifle Division
  81st Guards Rifle Division
 Independent
  213th Rifle Division
  27th Guards Tank Brigade
  201st Tank Brigade
  5th Anti-Aircraft Artillery Division

Deployed behind front lines:

 First Guards Tank Army (Mikhail Katukov)
  6th Tank Corps (Andrei Getman)
  31st Tank Corps
  3rd Mechanized Corps

 Sixty-Ninth Army (Vasily Kriuchenkin)
 48th Rifle Corps (Zinovy Rogozny)
  107th Rifle Division
  183rd Rifle Division
  305th Rifle Division
 49th Rifle Corps
  111th Rifle Division
  270th Rifle Division

 Front Assets
 35th Guards Rifle Corps
  92nd Guards Rifle Division
  93rd Guards Rifle Division
  94th Guards Rifle Division
 Independent
  2nd Guards Tank Corps
  5th Guards Tank Corps

 Second Air Army (Stepan Kravsovsky)
  1st Bombing Aviation Corps
  1st Assault Aviation Corps
  4th Fighter Aviation Corps
  5th Fighter Aviation Corps

Steppe Front 

Colonel General Ivan Konev

The front was formed from the Steppe Military District on 9 July, to serve as a reserve if the German attack broke through and to provide fresh troops for a counterattack to begin as soon as the German attack was halted. This order of battle does not show the complete composition of the Steppe Front. In addition to the units listed below, there were also the 4th Guards, 27th, 47th and 53rd Armies. The 4th Guards, 27th, 47th, and the 53rd Armies were held in reserve during the battle and thus did not participate. The 5th Guards Army and the 5th Guards Tank Army were both committed to the counterattack in the Battle of Prokhorovka, where they fought as part of the Voronezh Front.

Fifth Guards Army 
Lieutenant General Alexey Zhadov
 32nd Guards Rifle Corps (Major General Aleksandr Rodimtsev)
  13th Guards Rifle Division
  66th Guards Rifle Division
  6th Guards Airborne Division
 33rd Guards Rifle Corps (Major General Iosif Popov)
  95th Guards Rifle Division
  97th Guards Rifle Division
  9th Guards Airborne Division
 Independent 
  42nd Guards Rifle Division
  10th Tank Corps (Major General Vasily Burkov)
  29th Anti-Aircraft Artillery Division

Fifth Guards Tank Army
Lieutenant General Pavel Rotmistrov
  5th Guards Mechanized Corps (Major General Boris Skvortsov)
  18th Tank Corps (Major General Boris Bakharov)
  29th Tank Corps (Major General Ivan Kirichenko)
  6th Anti-Aircraft Artillery Division

Fifth Air Army 
Lieutenant General Sergei Goryunov
  7th Mixed Aviation Corps (Major General Pyotr Arkhangelsky)
  8th Mixed Aviation Corps (Major General Nikolai Kamanin)
  3rd Fighter Aviation Corps (Major General Yevgeny Savitsky)
  7th Fighter Aviation Corps (Major General Aleksandr Utin)

Citations

Notes

References
 
 
 
 
 
 
 

World War II orders of battle